Maral Feizbakhsh (born 22 September 1990 in Tehran, Iran) is a German sprinter. She competed in the 4 × 400 m relay event at the 2012 Summer Olympics.

References

1990 births
Living people
Sportspeople from Tehran
German female sprinters
Olympic athletes of Germany
Athletes (track and field) at the 2012 Summer Olympics
Olympic competitors from Iran who represented other countries
Iranian emigrants to Germany
Olympic female sprinters